The Cucaracha Formation (Tca) is a geologic formation in Panama. It preserves vertebrate and plant fossils dating back to the Neogene period; Early to Middle Miocene epochs (Hemingfordian). Fossils of the crocodylian Centenariosuchus, the turtle Rhinoclemmys panamaensis and the artiodactyl Paratoceras have been found in the formation.

Fossil content 
 Centenariosuchus
 Panascleroticoxylon
 Paratoceras coatesi
 Prioria canalensis, P. hodgesii
 Rhinoclemmys panamaensis
 Rourea blatta
 Staurotypus moschus
 Podocnemididae indet.

See also 
 List of fossiliferous stratigraphic units in Panama

References

Bibliography 
 
 
 
 
 
 
 
 
 

Geologic formations of Panama
Burdigalian
Langhian
Neogene Panama
Barstovian
Hemingfordian
Paleontology in Panama
Sandstone formations
Conglomerate formations
Shale formations
Deltaic deposits
Formations
Formations